Prince of Wales was an East Indiaman launched in 1803. She was on her first voyage for the British East India Company when she foundered in 1804 on her homeward voyage. Captain John Price left the Downs on 9 May 1803, bound for Bombay and Madras. Because she was sailing in a time of war, Price took out a letter of marque, which he received on 2 July 1803. Prince of Wales left Madras on 15 April 1804.

On the way the convoy ran into severe weather with the result that Prince of Wales foundered with the loss of all on board. She was last seen on 8 June 1804 in distress. The EIC valued her cargo at £28,860;

Notes, citations, and references
Notes

Citations

References
 
 

1803 ships
Ships of the British East India Company
Maritime incidents in 1804
Age of Sail merchant ships
Merchant ships of the United Kingdom
Shipwrecks
Missing ships
Ships lost with all hands